Hathara Denama Soorayo is a 2008 Sri Lankan Sinhala action romantic film directed and produced by Neil Rupasinghe. The film is a remake of 1971 blockbuster of the same name directed and produced by the same person. With that, the film became the second in the history of film industry in the world that the same Producer and Director did a re-make of the same film after 37 years with the same theme creating a world record. The four protagonist roles are played by stars Buddhika Jayarathne, Roshan Pilapitiya, Jagath Chamila and Amila Abeysekara in lead roles along with Chathurika Peiris and Kanchana Mendis. Music composed by Jayantha Ratnayake. It is the 1101st Sri Lankan film in the Sinhala cinema.

Plot

Cast
 Buddhika Jayaratne as Podde ayya
 Roshan Pilapitiya as Vijay
 Jagath Chamila as Jagiriya aka Jaggi
 Amila Abeysekara as Linton
 Chathurika Peiris as Nilmini
 Kanchana Mendis as Soma
 Chinthaka Kulatunga as Harry
 Duleeka Marapana as Soma's mother, Bath amma
 Chandika Nanayakkara as Police officer
 Tissa Wijesurendra as Mr. Samarasinghe, Nilmini's father 
 Nadeeka Gunasekara as Mrs. Samarasinghe, Nilmini's step mother 
 Gnananga Gunawardena as Uncle
 Teddy Vidyalankara
 Nadeesha Alahapperuma as Jaggi's fiancée 
 Manjula Thilini as Sumana
 Kavindu Perera as Sumana's brother

Soundtrack

References

2008 films
2000s Sinhala-language films
Films set in Sri Lanka (1948–present)